Nobody's Children is a Big Finish original novella collection, featuring Bernice Summerfield, a character from the spin-off media based on the long-running British science fiction television series Doctor Who. It was published in 2007.

Stories

The three stories are connected, each leading on from the previous. The story concerns Benny (Bernice Summerfield) getting involved with an aquatic species of shape-shifters in conflict with the Draconians.

External links

Big Finish Productions - Nobody's Children

2007 British novels
2007 science fiction novels
Bernice Summerfield novels
Big Finish New Worlds
British science fiction novels
Novels by Jonathan Blum
Novels by Kate Orman
Novels by Philip Purser-Hallard
Doctor Who novellas